Anthracohyus was a genus of extinct artiodactyl ungulate mammal belonging to Anthracotheriidae that lived in Asia during the middle to late Eocene.

Taxonomy
Anthracohyus is treated as a junior synonym of Anthracotherium by Tsubamoto et al. (2002) based on similarities in dental morphology. However, this synonymy was rejected by Lihoreau and Ducrocq (2007).

Distribution
Fossils of Anthracohyus are known from Myanmar, and Thailand.

References 

Anthracotheres
Eocene even-toed ungulates
Eocene mammals of Asia
Prehistoric even-toed ungulate genera